Marius Funk (born 1 January 1996) is a German professional footballer who plays as a goalkeeper for  club FC Ingolstadt. He is the brother of Patrick Funk.

Club career 
In April 2014 Marius Funk extended his contract with VfB Stuttgart until 2017. He made his debut for VfB Stuttgart II on 25 July 2015 in the 3. Liga against Dynamo Dresden.

On 21 May 2022, Funk signed with FC Ingolstadt.

International career 
Funk was Germany's first choice goalkeeper at the 2015 UEFA European Under-19 Championship.

References

External links 
 
 
 
 

1996 births
Living people
People from Aalen
Sportspeople from Stuttgart (region)
German footballers
Footballers from Baden-Württemberg
Association football goalkeepers
Germany youth international footballers
Bundesliga players
2. Bundesliga players
3. Liga players
Regionalliga players
VfB Stuttgart II players
SpVgg Greuther Fürth players
SpVgg Greuther Fürth II players
FC Ingolstadt 04 players